The 21st Toronto Film Critics Association Awards, honoring the best in film for 2017, were awarded on December 10, 2017.

Winners

References

2017
2017 film awards
2017 in Toronto
2017 in Canadian cinema